Hotse Sjoerd Durk Bartlema (1 May 1911 – 25 February 1987) was a Dutch rower. He competed at the 1936 Summer Olympics in Berlin with the men's coxed four where they came fourth.

References

1911 births
1987 deaths
Dutch male rowers
Olympic rowers of the Netherlands
Rowers at the 1936 Summer Olympics
People from Wûnseradiel
European Rowing Championships medalists
Sportspeople from Friesland
20th-century Dutch people